William Hilsman may refer to:
 William Hilsman (politician), American politician in Missouri
 William J. Hilsman, United States Army general

See also
 Bill Hillsman, American political consultant and advertising executive